Malin may refer to:

Places

  4766 (1987 FF1) Malin, an asteroid, see List of minor planets: 4001–5000
 Rivière du Malin (Malin River), a tributary of Jacques-Cartier River, in Quebec, Canada
 Malin, Homalin, Sagaing Region, Burma
 Malin, Xinning, a Yao ethnic township of Xinning County, Hunan, China
 Nový Malín, a village and municipality in Šumperk District in the Olomouc Region of the Czech Republic
 Malin Head, the northernmost point of Ireland
 Malin, one of the sea areas used in UK Shipping Forecasts
 Malin, County Donegal, Ireland, the village that gives its name to Malin Head
 Malin, Poland, a village in Lower Silesia (formerly German Mahlen)
 Malin, a village in Nușeni Commune, Bistriţa-Năsăud County, Romania
 Malyn (Malin), a city in Zhytomyr Oblast of Ukraine
 For the Malin Chassidic Dynasty originating from that city, see Chernobyl (Hasidic dynasty)
 Malyn (Malin), a village in Mlyniv Raion in Rivne Oblast of Ukraine
 Malin, Oregon, a city in Klamath County, Oregon, United States
 Malin Airport (FAA id: 4S8), an airport in Klamath, Oregon, USA

Name
 Malin (given name), a feminine Swedish given name
 Malin (surname), a surname

Other uses
 Malin people, an ethnic group in Burma
 Malin (The King of Fighters), female character from The King of Fighters fighting game series
 Malin, the brother of Mempricius in Welsh legend
 Malin Space Science Systems, San Diego, California company that designs unmanned spacecraft
 French ship Le Malin, four ships of the French Navy have borne the name Le Malin ("clever one" in French)
 Malins (disambiguation)